Roaches may refer to:
 Carl Roaches (born 1953), a former American football player
 The Roaches, a gritstone escarpment in Staffordshire, England
 Rutilus or roaches, a genus of fishes
 Plural of "roach", another name for cockroach

See also
 Roach (disambiguation)
 The Roches, a female vocal group